Camphine, the burning fluid lamp fuel, not to be confused with camphene, the chemical.

Composition
Camphine was the trade name of a purified spirit of turpentine formerly used for lamps, generally prepared by distilling turpentine with quicklime. Camphine gives a very brilliant light when burned in a lamp, but, to prevent smoking, the lamp must have a very strong draft. To achieve this special lamps were constructed, called “Vesta lamps”. Liebig describes camphine as a blend of 1 part purified turpentine with three parts 93 to 94% grain alcohol. “It gives a very white light, not as bright as pure turpentine, but it can be burned in a simple lamp.”

History
The Library of Congress is digitizing old newspapers under its Chronicling America program.
  The files are searchable making it possible to compare published dates with newspaper stories. The first reference to camphine appears in the July 11, 1838, issue of the NY Morning Herald.  AVM Webb has invented a new lamp for camphine which offers bright light and economy.  In the May 28, 1840, issue of the Baltimore Pilot and Transcript, T. Palmer & Co. has camphine oil lamps for sale.  He claims 13,000 are in use in New York City.  Later he claims exclusive availability of camphine lamps.

Russell reports that whale oil was commonly used in lamps until the 1840s when prices began to rise. Lard lamps were an early substitute beginning in about 1842. Camphine was the first fuel used in burning fluid lamps.  Henry Porter of Bangor, Maine patented a turpentine/alcohol blend and the name "burning fluid" in 1835.  Hence, the name Porter's Burning Fluid. The mix had been developed as a fuel for oil lamps by Isaiah Jennings of New York in 1830.  A typical camphine lamp has wick tubes forming a V. They have caps resembling thimbles to extinguish the light and to prevent evaporation when the lamp is not in use.  Whale oil lamps could be upgraded to use the new fuel by installing camphene burners, but the combination of more flammable fluid and the larger fonts in whale oil lamps sometimes caused lamps to explode.

The flammability of burning fluid posed a hazard. Spillage could start a fire. In 1853, Scientific American reported thirty-three deaths from burning fluid lamps the previous year.— The most significant incident was the St. Louis Theater fire on June 12, 1846, in Quebec City, Canada. The fire began when someone knocked over a burning fluid lamp; 45 people died.

Economic history
In a PBS Newshour story, Professor Bill Kovarik of Carnegie Mellon University examined the popular idea that whale oil was replaced by kerosene. He found that camphine dominated the market between the two. Camphine prevailed until Congress decided to tax alcohol to fund the Civil War. The tax applied to the alcohol used in camphine making it more costly than kerosene.

Kovarik estimated prices in 1850 as follows:

 Camphine or “burning fluid” — 50 cents/gallon (combinations of alcohol, turpentine and camphor oil – bright, sweet smelling)
 whale oil — $1.30 to $2.50/gallon
 lard oil — 90 cents (low quality, smelly)
 coal oil — 50 cents (sooty, smelly, low quality) (the original “kerosene”)
 kerosene from petroleum — 60 cents (introduced in early 1860s)

He estimated production of camphine at close to 200 million gallon per year vs 18 million gallon for whale oil in 1845. Kerosene reached the 200 million gallon level only in 1870. Hence, camphine burning fluid dominated in the interim between whale oil and kerosene.

Between 1860 and 1866, the price of 25MM gal of burning fluid increased from between $0.45 and $0.60/gal to $4/gal. By 1866, consumption of camphine was insignificant.

Taxation
Congress passed the Revenue Act of 1862 to help pay for the Civil War. Excise tax was applied to a wide range of products including alcohol. In 1860, 1138 distilleries produced 88MM gallons of spirits with an average price of $0.1440/gal. A proof gallon is defined at a gallon of 100 proof alcohol (consisting of 50 parts absolute alcohol and 53.71 parts of water, specific gravity 0.93353 by hygrometer at 60 deg F). 

Raw alcohol is used for industrial purposes, primarily for burning fluid, but also as solvent for paints and lacquers and in pharmaceutical preparations and patent medicines. Further processing results in beverage grade alcohols. Initially the tax was $0.15/proof gallon of raw alcohol, $0.25 for beverage alcohol, $0.15 for whiskey, and $0.30/gal for brandy, rum, gin, and wine.

In 1864, Congress raised the tax to $0.20 to March 7, then $0.60/gal to Jun 30, and collected $28MM on 85MM gal sold. In 1865, the rate increased to $1.50/gal for 6 months and then $2/gal. Collections fell to $16MM on 17MM gal. In 1866 and 67, the tax remained at $2/gal and $29MM was collected on 14.6MM gal and $28MM on 14.1 MM gal.  The conclusion was that much was stored in anticipation of rising taxes and that high tax rates resulted in more fraud. In 1869, the tax was reduced to $0.50/gal. The government collected $33MM in 1869 and $38.6 MM in 1870.

References

Liquid fuels
Terpenes and terpenoids
Household chemicals